Now defunct, The National Youth Wind Ensemble of Great Britain (NYWE) was regarded as one of the top youth wind groups in Europe, and hailed by Timothy Reynish as "one of the best wind groups in the world.".

History

NYWE was originally formed as an élite group of performers from the National Children's Wind Orchestra of Great Britain (NCWO), which still exists today. The group worked under the name The National Children's Wind Ensemble but changed to its present name, The National Youth Wind Ensemble of Great Britain, to enable older children to join the ensemble. Members after had to be aged 19 or younger, and of a standard at least equivalent to, or above, Grade 8 and Diploma standard: entry is by audition only.

The ensemble used to rehearse as part of the National Children's Wind Orchestra for the main part, and only occasionally rehearsed as the smaller ensemble group. This changed when the group became a separate entity in 1998, although many of the players in the group today have been members of the NCWO prior to their membership of NYWE. The ensemble has been conducted since its inception by Phillip Scott, who continues to push the high playing standards with demanding, technical and time-consuming music, leading to the very high standard achieved by the group today. Many former members have gone on to pursue careers in musical performance, as soloists or in renowned ensembles around the world.

Ever since its formation, the ensemble has worked on the principle of a single player to each musical part or voice. This approach is unique among British youth wind ensembles performing in the national and international arena, and it has helped NYWE establish an enviable international reputation. The group specialises in the performance of music which has appeared during the last twenty years, although music of earlier eras is also performed.

The band has always used around 40 players. In 2007, the band had 43 players.

NYWE has frequented such musical conferences and events such as the WASBE (World Association of Symphonic Wind Bands and Ensembles) Conference in Sweden 2003, and Ireland in 2007. It was after NYWE's performance at the 2007 WASBE held at Killarney, Ireland, that the world-renowned conductor, adjudicator and lecturer Timothy Reynish described NYWE as "one of the best wind groups in the world, with a professionalism unique in the UK and I would guess anywhere". At the WASBE 2007 Conference the ensemble gave breathtaking performances of the very demanding Philip Grange clarinet concerto "Sheng Sheng Bu Shi" featuring soloist Sarah Williams (former Young Musician of the Year finalist), "Diaghilev Dances" by Kenneth Hesketh and the world premiere of Joseph Phibbs's "The Spiralling Night", before finishing their programme with a stunning performance of Michael Ball's "Omaggio".

Throughout its time NYWE has performed several world premieres of high-profile pieces. NYWE regularly commissions world-renowned composers, most recently Joseph Phibbs, Michael Torke, Jacques Cohen and Anthony Bailey. In July 2009, NYWE gave the world premiere of Cloud Atlas, a major new work by Philip Grange, based on the 2004 Man Booker Prize shortlisted novel by David Mitchell at the 2009 Cheltenham Music Festival on 12 July 2009.

NYWE attended the 2011 WASBE held in Taiwan, where they performed Percy Grainger's The Immovable Do, "The Ciphering C," Richard Rodney Bennett's Trumpet Concerto (Huw Morgan, soloist), Anthony Gilbert's Dream Carousels, Chiu-Yu Chou's Dream Sun on the Sea, and Philip Grange's Cloud Atlas.

NYWE's final concert was at Saffron Hall in April 2018.

Recordings

The ensemble started making recordings early after its creation, mainly for sale at an event where the ensemble performs. Several live performances have been taken and broadcast on CD and Radio. NYWE's acclaimed appearance at the 2000 BBC Proms Millennium Youth Day at the Royal Albert Hall, was broadcast live on Radio 3.

See also 
National Children's Wind Orchestra of Great Britain
National Children's Wind Sinfonia of Great Britain
List of youth orchestras

References

External links
 The National Youth Wind Ensemble of Great Britain (NYWE)

Wind bands
British classical music groups
1998 establishments in the United Kingdom
Musical groups established in 1988
Youth organisations based in the United Kingdom